Stephanie Best (born October 16, 1969, in New Orleans, Louisiana) is a retired female track and field athlete from the United States, who competed in the middle distance events. She won the bronze medal in the women's 1,500 metres at the 1999 Pan American Games in Winnipeg, Manitoba, Canada.

References
 USA Track & Field

1969 births
Living people
American female middle-distance runners
Track and field athletes from New Orleans
Athletes (track and field) at the 1999 Pan American Games
Pan American Games bronze medalists for the United States
Pan American Games medalists in athletics (track and field)
Medalists at the 1999 Pan American Games
21st-century American women